Maharaja is a 2005 Kannada-language family drama film directed by Om Sai Prakash featuring Sudeep and Nikita Thukral in the lead roles. The film features background score and soundtrack composed by S. A. Rajkumar and lyrics by K. Kalyan and V. Nagendra Prasad. The film released on 14 January 2005.

Plot 
A married couple have a child and they adopt a child (Sudeep). However, their own son starts to feel vengeful about his adopted brother.

Cast
 Sudeep as Surya 
 Nikita Thukral as Sitara
 Bharathi Vishnuvardhan as Annapoorna (Surya's mother)
 Ashok as Rajashekar (Surya's father)
 Avinash as Vishakantayya
 Doddanna as Kithapathi Naaga
 Tennis Krishna as Gunjappa
 Sundar Raj as Surya's uncle
 Dharma as Surya's brother-in-law
 Adarsh as Kiran (Surya's brother)
 Bharath Bhagavathar as Surya's brother
 Aravind as Surya's brother
 Baby Priyanka
 Baby Prathiksha
 Master Kishan
 Amulya

Soundtrack

Soundtrack was composed by S. A. Rajkumar."Kandamma Kandamma" Song Reused From "Chaamanthi Poobanthi" From Telugu Film Puttintiki Ra Chelli Telugu Version Also Sung Legendary Singer K. S. Chithra

Awards

Karnataka State Film Awards :-
Best Female Playback Singer - K.S. Chitra

References

External links
 

2005 films
Indian drama films
2000s Kannada-language films
Indian family films
Films directed by Sai Prakash